is a drifting driver who in 2008 made the switch from D1 Grand Prix into the US Formula D series before moving back to Japan in 2010 to compete in the Formula Drift series there. He drove a Mazda RX-8 which was tuned with a 20B three-rotor engine producing a power of 429HP.  He has achieved one victory from the D1GP series, came second place in Formula Drift Japan 2019 and won the series in 2020 for Team Weld driving a Toyota JZX100. Previously he was known for driving the Toyota AE86 and is one of the founding members of the legendary Japanese drift team Running Free.

References

Japanese racing drivers
Drifting drivers
D1 Grand Prix drivers
Formula D drivers
Living people
Year of birth missing (living people)